Bhagamandala Nad was a constituency of the Coorg Legislative Assembly, the legislature of the Coorg State in India elected in 1952. The constituency included Bhagamandala. The economy of the area was dominated by export of honey and cardamom.  The constituency was abolished in 1956.

1952 election
Three candidates contested the 1952 legislative election for the Bhagamandala Nad seat: 
 Konana Deviah, Indian National Congress, won the seat with 2,347 votes (58.62%)
 Pattamada Ponnappa, independent, 1,384 votes (34.57%)
 Jayaram Singh, independent, 273 votes (6.82%)

With an electoral participation of 80.3% Bhagamandala Nad had one of the highest voter turn-outs in the 1952 assembly elections in India.

References

Assembly constituencies of Coorg

1951 establishments in India
1956 disestablishments in India
Constituencies established in 1951
Constituencies disestablished in 1956